Huazhaidao (华斋道 "Way of Flowers and Fasting") is a Chinese folk religious sect of Henan that as of the 1980s was a proscribed religion in China as testified by the arrest of various Communist Party members who joined the sect in those years.

History
Yang Sende (or Desen) and Yang Maicun were two members of the sect who were arrested in Linzhou, Henan, in the 1980s. According to official reports, Sende was a brigade leader and Communist Party member since 1946. The Yangs spread the teachings of the Huazhaidao sect by claiming their efficacy in healing the sick. In Linzhou they persuaded dozens of Communist Party members and local civil servants to join the Huazhaidao.

See also
 Chinese salvationist religions

References

Sources
 
 List first published in: 

Chinese salvationist religions